The Myrton Baronetcy, of Gogar in the County of Edinburgh, was a title in the Baronetage of Nova Scotia.  It was created on 28 June 1701 for Andrew Myrton. The title became extinct on the death of the second Baronet in 1774.

Myrton baronets, of Gogar (1701)
Sir Andrew Myrton, 1st Baronet (died 1720)
Sir Robert Myrton, 2nd Baronet (died 1774)

References

Extinct baronetcies in the Baronetage of Nova Scotia